The 2018 PEI Tankard, the provincial men's curling championship of Prince Edward Island, was held from January 13 to 9 at the Cornwall Curling Club in Cornwall, Prince Edward Island. The winning Eddie MacKenzie team represented Prince Edward Island at the 2018 Tim Hortons Brier.

Teams

The teams are listed as follows:

Knockout draw brackets

A Event

B Event

C Event

Playoffs

Final
Sunday, January 7, 1:00 pm

MacKenzie needed to be beaten twice

References

http://peicurling.com/tankard20172018/

2018 Tim Hortons Brier
Curling competitions in Prince Edward Island
Queens County, Prince Edward Island
2018 in Prince Edward Island
January 2018 sports events in Canada